Stokes' formula can refer to:
Stokes' law for friction force in a viscous fluid.
Stokes' law (sound attenuation) law describing attenuation of sound in Newtonian liquids.
Stokes' theorem on the integration of differential forms.
Stokes' formula (gravity) a formula in geodesy